Joseph Keeler (May 24, 1824 – January 21, 1881) was an Ontario businessman and political figure. He represented Northumberland East in the House of Commons of Canada as a Liberal-Conservative member from 1867 to 1874 and from 1879 to 1881.

He was born in Cramahe Township, Upper Canada in 1814 and educated at Upper Canada College. Keeler was a grain and lumber merchant and also owned a wharf, warehouses and a flour mill at Colborne. He was also the owner of a schooner. He was postmaster there and also served as a major in the local militia. Keeler operated a printing business which produced one of the first newspapers in the region, the Colborne Transcript. He helped establish a branch of the Bank of Toronto at Colborne and also helped promote the development of the Trent-Severn Waterway.

On October 12, 1848, he married Octavia Phillips. Keeler died in office in Ottawa at the age of 56.

His father, Joseph Abbott Keeler, was credited with being the founder of Colborne and his grandfather, a United Empire Loyalist from Vermont also named Joseph Keeler, was one of the first settlers in the township.

References

1824 births
1881 deaths
Conservative Party of Canada (1867–1942) MPs
Members of the House of Commons of Canada from Ontario